The 2014 season was Aalesunds FK's eight consecutive season in the Tippeligaen, and their second season was with Jan Jönsson as their manager. They finished the season in 7th position, and reached the Fourth round of the Norwegian Cup, where they were defeated by Lillestrøm.

Squad

Transfers

Winter

In:

Out:

Summer

In:

Out:

Competitions

Tippeligaen

Results summary

Results by round

Results

Table

Norwegian Cup

Squad statistics

Appearances and goals

|-
|colspan="14"|Players away from Aalesunds on loan:
|-
|colspan="14"|Players who appeared for Aalesunds no longer at the club:

|}

Goal scorers

Disciplinary record

References

Aalesunds FK seasons
Aalesunds